Mads Møller Hansen (born 20 July 1976) is a Danish sailor. He competed in the men's 470 event at the 2004 Summer Olympics.

References

External links
 
 

1976 births
Living people
Danish male sailors (sport)
Olympic sailors of Denmark
Sailors at the 2004 Summer Olympics – 470
Place of birth missing (living people)